Krzysztof Iwanicki (born 10 April 1963) is a Polish former professional footballer who played as a midfielder.

Career
Before the second half of 1983–84, Iwanicki signed for Polish second tier side Hutnik Warszawa. In 1985, he signed for Legia Warszawa in the Polish top flight, where he made 136 league appearances and scored 16 goals, helping them win the 1988–89 and 1989–90 Polish Cups. In 1991, Iwanicki signed for French second tier club Canet, where he suffered relegation to the French third tier and suffered an injury.

In 1995, he signed for Cherbourg in the French fourth tier, helping them earn promotion to the French third tier. In 2001, Iwanicki signed for Polish fourth tier team . Before the second half of 2002–03, he signed for Legion Warszawa in the Polish sixth tier.

References

External links
 

Living people
1963 births
Polish footballers
Footballers from Warsaw
Association football midfielders
Ekstraklasa players
I liga players
III liga players
Ligue 2 players
Championnat National players
Championnat National 2 players
Legia Warsaw players
Hutnik Warsaw players
Gwardia Warsaw players
Canet Roussillon FC players
AS Cherbourg Football players
Znicz Pruszków players
Polish expatriate footballers
Polish expatriate sportspeople in France
Expatriate footballers in France